The Guernsey Financial Services Commission is the regulatory body for the finance sector in the Bailiwick of Guernsey. It supervises and regulates over 2,000 licensees from within the banking, fiduciary, investment and insurance sectors in accordance with standards set by international bodies such as the Basel Committee for Banking Supervisors, the International Association of Insurance Supervisors, the International Organisation of Securities Commissions and the Financial Action Task Force on Money Laundering.

The Commission uses a risk based approach to the supervision of licensees which is underpinned by a system known as PRISM.

See also
 List of banks in Guernsey

References

External links 
Official site

Financial regulatory authorities
Economy of Guernsey
Regulators of the United Kingdom